RSDr. Vasiľ Biľak (11 August 1917 – 6 February 2014) was a Slovak Communist politician and leader of Rusyn origin.

Vasiľ Biľak was born in Krajná Bystrá, in the Sáros County of the Kingdom of Hungary (present-day Slovakia) in a family of Rusyn ethnicity and was originally a tailor and inseam expert. Active in the communist movement since 1936, In 1955–1968 and 1969–1971 he was a member of the Central Committee of the Communist Party of Slovakia (ÚV KSS); in  1962–1968 he was the secretary and from January until August 1968 General secretary of ÚV KSS; from April 1968 until December 1988 a member of the Presidium of the Central Committee of the Communist Party of Czechoslovakia (ÚV KSČ). From November 1968 until December 1988 he was a secretary of ÚV KSČ with significant influence on the foreign policy and the ideology of the party. In 1960–1989 he was a member of National Assembly, later Federal Assembly.

In 1968 he belonged to the exponents of the hardline wing in the KSČ; he supported the Soviet invasion and participated on the so-called "normalisation process" after the political liberalization called the Prague Spring.

He was one of the politicians who signed the invitation letter for the armies of Warsaw Pact countries. In December 1989, he was suspended from the KSČ. The Slovak Justice Minister Ján Čarnogurský said in 2001 he would not ask the Slovak President Rudolf Schuster to grant an amnesty to Biľak, the Czechoslovak Communist Party ideologist was charged with treason in connection with the "invitation" sent to Warsaw Pact countries to extend "brotherly help" to Czechoslovakia in 1968. In 2011, the trial process with Biľak ended unsuccessfully, when the attorney stopped it for lack of witnesses.

He died in 2014, aged 96, in Bratislava. He was the last of the original five Tankies to die.

References

1917 births
2014 deaths
People from Svidník District
People from the Kingdom of Hungary
Rusyn people
Slovak people of Rusyn descent
Members of the Central Committee of the Communist Party of Czechoslovakia
Communist Party of Slovakia (1939) politicians
Members of the National Assembly of Czechoslovakia (1960–1964)
Members of the National Assembly of Czechoslovakia (1964–1968)
Members of the Chamber of the People of Czechoslovakia (1969–1971)
Members of the Chamber of the People of Czechoslovakia (1971–1976)
Members of the Chamber of the People of Czechoslovakia (1976–1981)
Members of the Chamber of the People of Czechoslovakia (1981–1986)
Members of the Chamber of the People of Czechoslovakia (1986–1990)
Prague Spring
Recipients of the Order of Lenin